Superforecasting: The Art and Science of Prediction is a book by Philip E. Tetlock and Dan Gardner released in 2015. It details findings from The Good Judgment Project.

Reviews
The Economist reports that superforecasters are clever (with a good mental attitude), but not necessarily geniuses. It reports on the treasure trove of data coming from The Good Judgment Project, showing that accurately selected amateur forecasters (and the confidence they had in their forecasts) were often more accurately tuned than experts. According to The Wall Street Journal, Superforecasting is "The most important book on decision making since Daniel Kahneman's Thinking, Fast and Slow." The Harvard Business Review paired it to the book How Not to Be Wrong: The Power of Mathematical Thinking by Jordan Ellenberg.

See also 
 Guesstimate
 Fermi problem

References

External links
 Daily catch-up: dart-throwing chimpanzees and how to predict the future | Comment | Voices | The Independent
 SUPERFORECASTING | Kirkus Reviews
 Superforecasting: The Art and Science of Prediction
 Good Judgment® Open

American non-fiction books
2015 non-fiction books
Forecasting
Crown Publishing Group books